A government platform is the political platform of a government. When entering office, a new government lists their objectives for the term. Government platforms are especially important in coalition governments, where several parties with possibly conflicting political platforms agree on a compromise – a coalition agreement. The distinction between a party platform and a government platform may be blurred in countries where single parties often form governments.

See also 

 Election promise
 Mandate (politics)
 Manifesto

Election campaigning
Political communication